Marie-Sophie Lacarrau (born 20 September 1975 in Villefranche-de-Rouergue) is a French journalist and TV presenter.

Biography  
Born in the Aveyron, Marie-Sophie Lacarrau grew up near Perpignan. After high school, she attended a literary college (lycée Fermat) in Toulouse in 1995, before obtaining a literature degree at the University of Mirail.

In 1996, she began internships in the newspapers Midi Libre and Le Villefranchois,  then the TV channels LCI and M6.

In 2000, Marie-Sophie Lacarrau began work at the editing department of France 3 Quercy-Rouergue, then two years later at France 3 Midi-Pyrénées, where she presented her first regional news TV show during the Christmas holidays of 2005.

In 2010, she replaced Catherine Matausch on France 3 at weekends and became understudy to Carole Gaessler at the 19/20 national news show.

Since 2016, she has also presented the economy programme In Situ on France 3.

In the fall of 2016, she succeeded Élise Lucet as presenter of the news show 13 heures on France 2.

Personal life  
She married Pierre Bascol on 12 August 2006.  She has two children.

References  

1975 births
Living people
People from Villefranche-de-Rouergue
Lycée Pierre-de-Fermat alumni
University of Toulouse alumni
French television presenters
French television journalists
21st-century French journalists
French women journalists
Women television journalists
French women television presenters
21st-century French women